Lee Avenue Historic District is a national historic district located at Sanford, Lee County, North Carolina. It encompasses 70 contributing buildings in the historic village of Jonesboro, now part of Sanford.  The district includes notable examples of Bungalow / American Craftsman style architecture, with buildings largely dated between about 1882 to the 1940s.  Notable buildings include the Pierce-Seawell House (c. 1882), Barnes House (c. 1886), Jonesboro Methodist Church Parsonage (c. 1885), Lonnie Thomas House (1941), and Jonesboro Baptist Church (1950).

It was listed on the National Register of Historic Places in 2002.

References

Historic districts on the National Register of Historic Places in North Carolina
Buildings and structures in Lee County, North Carolina
National Register of Historic Places in Lee County, North Carolina